Seconds Late for the Brighton Line is a 2010 album by The Legendary Pink Dots released on CD and black vinyl double LP. The LP has an additional live track from a 2009 performance in Germany, featured as the entirety of side D. In November 2013, the album was released on Bandcamp with an additional bonus track.

Track listings

CD

LP

MP3

Credits
Edward Ka-Spel - vocals, synthesizers, keyboards, devices
The Silverman (Phil Knight) - synthesizers, keyboards, devices, percussion, vocals on "Someday"
Erik Drost - electric, acoustic, bass and Hawaiian guitars
Raymond Steeg - mixing and engineering

References/External links
Artist page on ROIR
Album page at Discogs

The Legendary Pink Dots albums
2010 albums